Alexey Vasilyevich Papin (born 6 October 1987) is a Russian boxer and former kickboxer who has held the IBF International title in 2018 and 2019.

As of September 2021, he is ranked as the sixth best cruiserweight in the world by Transnational Boxing Rankings Board, and seventh by The Ring and BoxRec.

Kickboxing career
He challenged Nenad Pagonis for W.A.K.O. Pro Low-Kick Rules Cruiser Heavyweight World Championship on 9 March 2013 in Monte Carlo, Monaco, losing the fight by split decision.
Revenge happened on 29 June 2013 in Moscow, Russia. This time Papin won the fight after second round by retirement, with Pagonis injuring his elbow. Papin added W.A.K.O. Pro Low-Kick Rules Cruiser Heavyweight World Championship in his treasury alongside ISKA Low-Kick Rules Super-cruiserweight World Championship and W5 Low-Kick Rules Championship.

Boxing career
Papin made his professional boxing debut against Sergey Beloshapkin on November 21, 2015. He won the fight by a fourth-round knockout. He amassed a 9-0 record during the next two years, stopping all but one of his opponents.

Papin was scheduled to face Willbeforce Shihepo for the vacant IBF International Cruiserweight title on June 23, 2018, at the Floyd Mayweather Boxing Academy in Zhukovka, Russia. He won the fight by an eight-round technical knockout. Papin knocked down Shihepo in the first round, although the Namibian was able to recover from it. Papin continued to land damaging strikes to his opponent however, opening a cut on Shihepo in the fifth round, before he knocked him down once again in the eight round. Following the second knockdown, the referee decided to stop the fight.

A year later, on June 16, 2019, Papin was scheduled to fight Alexandru Jur for the IBF International Cruiserweight title, which Papain had in the meantime vacated. Papin won the fight by a third-round knockout, stopping Jur at the 19 seconds into the round.

It was revealed on July 12, 2019, that Papin would challenge the reigning WBC Silver Cruiserweight titleholder Ilunga Makabu. The fight was confirmed fort the undercard of the Sergey Kovalev versus Anthony Yarde light heavyweight clash, which was scheduled for August 24, 2019, at the Traktor Ice Arena in Chelyabinsk, Russia. Makabu won the fight by majority decision, with two judges awarding him a 115-113 scorecard, while the third judge scored it as a 113-113 draw.

Papin was scheduled to face the fifth-ranked WBC cruiserweight contender Ruslan Fayfer in a WBC title eliminator on August 22, 2020, at the Pyramide in Kazan, Russia. Papin won the fight by a sixth-round knockout. Fayfer appeared up on the scorecards by the time of the stoppage, successfully scoring points from the outside and evading or blocking most of Papin's strikes. Early in sixth round, Papin dropped Fayfer with a left hook and punched him with two right hooks as he was going down. Although he was able to beat the count, the referee nonetheless decided to wave the fight off.

Papin was scheduled to face Vaclav Pejsar on April 2, 2021, at the Soviet Wings Sport Palace in Moscow, Russia, in a stay-busy fight. He made quick work of his journeyman opponent, and won by a first-round knockout. Pejsar was knocked down with a right overhand midway through the round, but was able to make it up before the eight count was finished. He was unable to mount any proper defense however, and was knocked out at the 2:10 minute mark of the round.

Papin was booked to face the one-time WBO world cruiserweight title challenger Dilan Prašović on May 27, 2022, at the Avangard Ice Hockey Academy in Omsk, Russia. He won the fight by a second-round stoppage, knocking Prašović down five times before the referee stopped the bout. Papin faced Damir Beljo on October 29, 2022, in his second bout of the year. He won the fight by a second-round knockout.

Titles

Boxing
2018 IBF International Cruiserweight title
2019 IBF International Cruiserweight title

Kickboxing
Professional
2013 W.A.K.O. Pro Low-Kick Rules Cruiser Heavyweight World Champion -94.1 kg 
2012 W5 World Champion
2012 W5 Low-Kick Rules Champion -91 kg 
2012 ISKA Low-Kick Rules Super-cruiserweight World Champion -91.8 kg
2011 Russian Professional Kickboxing Heavyweight Champion 

Amateur
2012 W.A.K.O. European Championships in Ankara, Turkey  −91 kg (Low-Kick rules)
2011 W.A.K.O. World Championships in Skopje, Macedonia  −91 kg (Low-Kick rules)
2011 W.A.K.O. World Cup Diamond  −91 kg (K-1 rules)
2011 W.A.K.O. World Cup in Rimini, Italy  −91 kg (Full-Contact rules)
2010 W.A.K.O. European Championships in Loutraki, Greece  −91 kg (Full-Contact rules)
2010 W.A.K.O. European Championships in Baku, Azerbaijan  −91 kg (Low-Kick rules)
2009 W.A.K.O. World Championships in Villach, Austria  +91 kg (K-1 rules)
2008 W.A.K.O. European Championships in Porto, Portugal  -86  kg (Low-Kick rules)

Professional boxing record

Kickboxing record

|-
|-  bgcolor="#CCFFCC"
| 2015-08-04 || Win ||align=left| Danyo Ilunga || Fight Night Saint-Tropez  || Saint Tropez, France || Decision (unanimous) || 4 || 2:00 || 10-1-1
|-
|-  bgcolor="#CCFFCC"
| 2015-03-13 || Win ||align=left| Agalar Sadikhzade  || Heydar Aliyev Cup  || St. Petersburg, Russia || KO (right high kick) || 2 ||  || 9-1-1
|-
|-  bgcolor="#CCFFCC"
| 2013-06-29 || Win ||align=left| Nenad Pagonis  || Martial Arts Festival  || Moscow, Russia || TKO (injury) || 3 || 0:00 || 8-1-1
|-
! style=background:white colspan=9 |
|-
|-  bgcolor="#FFBBBB"
| 2013-03-09 || Loss ||align=left| Nenad Pagonis  || Monte Carlo Fighting Masters || Monte Carlo, Monaco || Decision (split) || 3 || 3:00 || 7-1-1
|-
! style=background:white colspan=9 |
|-
|-  bgcolor="#CCFFCC"
| 2013-04-20 || Win ||align=left| Andrei Gerasimchuk  || Battle at Moscow 11 || Moscow, Russia || Decision (majority) || 3 || 3:00 || 7-0-1
|-
|-  bgcolor="#CCFFCC"
| 2012-05-26 || Win ||align=left| Elvin Abbasov  || Battle of Ural || Verkhnyaya Pyshma, Russia || Decision (unanimous) || 3 || 3:00 || 6-0-1
|-
|-  bgcolor="#CCFFCC"
| 2012-05-01 || Win ||align=left| Andrei Gerasimchuk  || Papin vs Gerasimchuk  || Moscow, Russia || Decision (unanimous) || 5 || 3:00 || 5-0-1
|-
|-  bgcolor="#CCFFCC"
| 2012-03-03 || Win ||align=left| Zinedine Hameur-Lain || Martial Arts Festival "For Russia" - 2 || Chelyabinsk, Russia || KO || 4 || || 4-0-1
|-  
! style=background:white colspan=9 |
|-
|-  bgcolor="#CCFFCC"
| 2012-01-01 || Win || ||  ||  ||  ||  || || 3-0-1
|-
! style=background:white colspan=9 |
|-
|-  bgcolor="#CCFFCC"
| 2011-12-23 || Win ||align=left| Igor Bugaenko || Rod Fighting - Shield and Sword 1  || Moscow, Russia || Ext. R. Decision || 4 ||3:00 || 2-0-1
|- 
|-  bgcolor="#CCFFCC"
| 2011-03-05 || Win ||align=left| Vitaliy Shemetov || Spear of Peresvet 2011 || Sergiyev Posad, Russia || Decision (unanimous) || 5 ||3:00 || 1-0-1
|- 
! style=background:white colspan=9 |
|-
|-  bgcolor="#c5d2ea"
| 2010-08-07 || Draw ||align=left| Anton Berdnikov || Battlefield || Ryazan, Russia || Decision || 3 ||2:00 || 0-0-1
|- 

|-
|-  bgcolor="#FFBBBB"
| 2012-11 || Loss ||align=left| Eugen Waigel || W.A.K.O World Championships 2012, Full-Contact Final -91 kg || Bucharest, Romania || TKO (injury) || 1 || 
|-
! style=background:white colspan=9 |
|-
|-  bgcolor="#CCFFCC"
| 2012-11-29 || Win ||align=left| Igor Prykhodko || W.A.K.O World Championships 2012, Full-Contact Semi Finals -91 kg  || Bucharest, Romania ||  ||  || 
|-
|-  bgcolor="#CCFFCC"
| 2012-11-28 || Win ||align=left| Mattia Bezzon || W.A.K.O World Championships 2012, Full-Contact Quarter Finals -91 kg  || Bucharest, Romania ||  ||  || 
|-
|-  bgcolor="#FFBBBB"
| 2012-11-01 || Loss ||align=left| Agron Preteni || W.A.K.O European Championships 2012, Low-Kick Semi Finals -91 kg  || Ankara, Turkey || Decision (unanimous) || 3 || 2:00
|-
! style=background:white colspan=9 |
|-
|-  bgcolor="#CCFFCC"
| 2011-11-02 || Win ||align=left| Toni Milanović || W.A.K.O World Championships 2011, Low-Kick Final -91 kg || Skopje, Macedonia || Decision (Unanimous) || 3 || 2:00
|-
! style=background:white colspan=9 |
|-
|-  bgcolor="#CCFFCC"
| 2011-10-28 || Win ||align=left| Rashil Amankulov || W.A.K.O World Championships 2011, Low-Kick Semi Finals -91 kg || Skopje, Macedonia || ||  || 
|-  bgcolor="#CCFFCC"
| 2010-11-25 || Win ||align=left| Denis Simkin || W.A.K.O European Championships 2010, Full contact Semi Finals -91 kg || Loutraki, Greece ||  ||  || 
|-
! style=background:white colspan=9 |
|-
|-  bgcolor="#CCFFCC"
| 2010-11-25 || Win ||align=left| Christodoulos Gkerekos || W.A.K.O European Championships 2010, Full contact Semi Finals -91 kg || Loutraki, Greece ||  ||  || 
|-
|-  bgcolor="#CCFFCC"
| 2010-11-23 || Win ||align=left| Cormac O'Connor || W.A.K.O European Championships 2010, Full contact Quarter Finals -91 kg || Loutraki, Greece || TKO ||  || 
|-
|-  bgcolor="#CCFFCC"
| 2010-10-24 || Win ||align=left| Toni Milanović || W.A.K.O European Championships 2010, Low-Kick Final -91 kg || Baku, Azerbaijan || Decision (Unanimous) || 3 || 2:00
|-
! style=background:white colspan=9 |
|-
|-  bgcolor="#CCFFCC"
| 2010-10-22 || Win ||align=left| Jovan Kaluđerović || W.A.K.O European Championships 2010, Low-Kick Semi Finals -91 kg  || Baku, Azerbaijan ||  ||  ||
|-  bgcolor="#FFBBBB"
| 2009-10 || Loss ||align=left| Alexei Kudin || W.A.K.O World Championships 2009, K-1 Semi Finals + 91 kg kg || Villach, Austria ||  ||  || 
|-
! style=background:white colspan=9 |
|-
|-  bgcolor="#CCFFCC"
| 2008-11-30 || Win ||align=left| Sidi Kone || W.A.K.O. European Championships 2008, Low Kick Final -86 kg || Porto, Portugal || KO ||  || 
|-
! style=background:white colspan=9 |
|-
|-  bgcolor="#CCFFCC"
| 2008-11-? || Win ||align=left| Marijo Valentić || W.A.K.O. European Championships 2008, Low Kick Semi Finals -86 kg || Porto, Portugal || Decision (Unanimous) || 3 || 2:00
|-
|-  bgcolor="#CCFFCC"
| 2008-11-? || Win ||align=left| Bruno Susano || W.A.K.O. European Championships 2008, Low Kick Quarter Finals -86 kg || Porto, Portugal || Decision (Unanimous) || 3 || 2:00
|-
|-  bgcolor="#FFBBBB"
| 2007-09-? || Loss ||align=left| Rail Rajabov || W.A.K.O World Championships 2007, Low-Kick 1st Round -81 kg || Belgrade, Serbia || Decision (Split) || 3 || 2:00
|-
|-
| colspan=9 | Legend:    
|-

See also 
List of WAKO Amateur World Championships
List of WAKO Amateur European Championships
List of male kickboxers

References

1987 births
Living people
Russian male kickboxers
Heavyweight kickboxers
Cruiserweight kickboxers
Light heavyweight kickboxers
People from Reutov
Light-heavyweight boxers
Russian male boxers
Sportspeople from Moscow Oblast